Dai Xianghui (born March 1966) is a former Chinese procurator and politician. He was investigated by China's top anti-graft agency in September 2021. Previously he served as deputy secretary of Ningxia Regional Politics and Law Commission.

Biography
Born in Beijing in March 1966, Dai graduated from Northwest University of Politics and Law and Xi'an University of Technology.

He entered the workforce in July 1988, and joined the Chinese Communist Party in June 1993. In July 1988, he began his politic career in northwest China's Ningxia Hui Autonomous Region as an official at the Yinchuan People's Procuratorate. At Yinchuan People's Procuratorate, he eventually became chief procurator in March 2006. He was despatched to Ningxia People's Procuratorate in October 2007. He moved up the ranks to become deputy chief procurator in November 2007 and deputy party branch secretary in March 2012. In December 2020, he was appointed deputy secretary of Ningxia Regional Politics and Law Commission, serving in the post until September 2021.

Downfall
On 10 September 2021, he was put under investigation for alleged "serious violations of discipline and laws" by the Central Commission for Discipline Inspection (CCDI), the party's internal disciplinary body, and the National Supervisory Commission, the highest anti-corruption agency of China.

References

1966 births
Living people
Northwest University of Politics and Law alumni
Xi'an University of Technology alumni
People's Republic of China politicians from Beijing
Chinese Communist Party politicians from Beijing